Antipodogomphus neophytus is a species of dragonfly of the family Gomphidae, 
known as the northern dragon. 
It is endemic to northern Australia, where it inhabits rivers and pools.

Antipodogomphus neophytus is a small to medium-sized black and yellow dragonfly with a long tail.

Gallery

See also
 List of Odonata species of Australia

References

Gomphidae
Odonata of Australia
Endemic fauna of Australia
Taxa named by Frederic Charles Fraser
Insects described in 1958